Richard Ehrenberg (5 February 1857 – 17 December 1921) was a German economist.

He taught at Rostock University from 1899 to 1921.

Literary works 

 Hamburg und Antwerpen seit 300 Jahren, 1889
 Hamburg und England im Zeitalter der Königin Elisabeth, 1896
 Das Zeitalter der Fugger, 2 Vols., 1896, -- an English translation is also available: Richard Ehrenberg, Capital & Finance in the Age of the Renaissance: A Study of the Fuggers and Their Connections, 1928, reprinted 1985
 Das Familie in ihrer Bedeutung für das Volksleben, 1916

External links 
 Gründung des Thünen-Archivs (PDF)

1857 births
1921 deaths
German economists

Ehrenberg family